Michal Schmuck (9 January 1909 – 11 June 1980) was a Czechoslovak/Slovak water polo player who competed at the 1928 Summer Olympics.

Schmuck was born in Pressburg/Pozsony, Austria-Hungary (today Bratislava, Slovakia). In 1928 he was part of the Czechoslovak team in the Olympic tournament. He played the only match.

He died in Bratislava, Czechoslovakia in 1980.

References
sports-reference

1909 births
1980 deaths
Czechoslovak male water polo players
Slovak male water polo players
Water polo players at the 1928 Summer Olympics
Olympic water polo players of Czechoslovakia
Sportspeople from Bratislava